Waqas Saleem (born 31 May 1985) is a Pakistani first-class cricketer who plays for Lahore.

References

External links
 

1985 births
Living people
Pakistani cricketers
Lahore cricketers
Cricketers from Lahore